The Trigun anime and manga series features an extensive cast of characters created by Yasuhiro Nightow. The series takes place on a fictional desert planet where humanity has taken up root after leaving Earth. In this western/steampunk setting, civilization is sparse and mostly lawless. The plot and characters of the series differ greatly between the original manga and its anime adaptation, the anime only following roughly up to the second volume of the manga before diverging into its own unique telling of the story. The series' storyline follows the adventures of the legendary gunman Vash the Stampede as he spreads his message of love and peace throughout the world while combating his brother Millions Knives and the Gung-Ho Guns assassins' leader Legato Bluesummers.

The main character of the series is Vash the Stampede, a jovial, pacifist gunman who is always followed by disaster and misfortune due to the large bounty on his head. During the early part of the series he is constantly chased by Meryl Stryfe and Milly Thompson, insurance agents assigned with the duty of evaluating damages involving Vash. Early on he also meets Nicholas D. Wolfwood, a violent and serious traveling preacher who becomes Vash's strongest fighting ally and friend throughout his adventures. Over the course of the series, Vash interacts and befriends many people across the globe. At odds with Vash and his companions is his twin brother Millions Knives, who hates humans and Vash's way of life. Closely following Knives is Legato Bluesummers, a cold and powerful man and his group of super-powered assassins, the Gung-Ho Guns.

Main characters

Vash the Stampede

Adult Vash 
Young Vash 

 is a sentient Plant known as "The Humanoid Typhoon" due to the destruction which surrounds him. Wielding a huge silver revolver, he travels from town to town. He is initially discovered by Meryl and Milly, representatives from an insurance agency investigating claims made due to damages caused by the mysterious "Humanoid Typhoon". The pair find Vash while he is being chased by bandits who want to collect the bounty on "The $$60,000,000,000 (sixty billion double dollar) Man". He and his brother, Knives, were born on a colony ship that was part of a fleet sent to find and settle a new world in order to extend the human race. They were raised by Rem, who instilled upon Vash the philosophy that every being deserves life, and Vash now takes this to the extreme by always attempting to save everyone. Knives on the other hand, sickened by the actions of the humans around him, caused the fleet to crash, which killed Rem and many others. Vash has made it his purpose to hunt down and stop Knives from harming anyone else. Vash was forced to destroy the city of July during one of his confrontations with Knives, which haunts him considerably and starts his reputation.

Due to his overly exaggerated reputation, Vash usually acts the fool in order to make people feel comfortable and to hide his identity. He frequently voices the catchphrase, "This world is made of love and peace," which is usually complemented by his flashing of the v sign. However, when those around him are threatened, Vash shows complete focus and control. Because Vash refuses to kill his opponents, he often suffers at the hands of his very persistent enemies. As a result, his body is a patchwork of large scars and chunks of missing flesh supported by metal mesh. In the anime, Vash lost his left arm during the conflict in July. In Volume 12 of the Trigun Maximum manga, it is revealed in a flashback that it was severed by Knives in retaliation for Vash shooting him in the shoulder after Knives massacred an entire town. It is later replaced by a cybernetic arm that contains an integrated gun. Vash says his full name is Valentinez Alkalinella Xifax Sicidabohertz Gombigobilla Blue Stradivari Talentrent Pierre Andri Charton-Haymoss Ivanovici Baldeus George Doitzel Kaiser III, but this may just be another exaggerated joke.

Vash's main weapon is the "Angel Arm," a large cannon capable of destroying cities. The anime depicts it as a modified version of the Dan Wesson ppc 357, specially created by Knives to fuse with Vash and transform into the "Angel Arm" itself. In the manga however, it is shown as being a natural part of a Plant, with far greater versatility, capable of being manipulated into various forms other than a cannon. In the manga, it is powered by the life-force of its user, and using the power slowly causes Vash's life to drain, which causes his hair to slowly turn black. Vash later learns better control over his power, forming smaller cannons and defensive feathers, though his hair continues to grow darker until it becomes almost completely black. The anime, however, depicts no such restrictions.

A recurring joke in the anime is that characters will facetiously mistake a cat for Vash. For example, when he and Wolfwood are eating, Vash disappears and a cat turns up in his place. This prompts Wolfwood to say "I always had my suspicions that you were no mere mortal, but I never imagined that you were actually a cat."

AnimeOnDVD describes Vash's character as "..running a gamut of emotions and attitudes (and shows off his way cool dancing moves) as well as a bit of what makes him the most feared person and worthy of the $$60,000,000,000 price on his head..." In a review for Volume 5, the reviewer stated that the change in Vash's character; "..brings things to a different and more interesting level.." Vash's history was described as "..really interesting but they tend to have more questions asked than really answered." T.H.E.M Anime Reviews say that Vash "...is the poster-child for the misunderstood hero.." Various merchandise on Vash's appearance has been made including plush dolls, keychains & action figures.

IGN ranked Vash as the 17th top anime character of all time, praising his character design.

Meryl Stryfe

 AKA "Derringer Meryl" and her junior coworker and best friend, Milly, are agents of the Bernardelli Insurance Society sent to evaluate claims regarding Vash the Stampede. She's hotheaded and strong willed. Initially, she finds Vash to be a nuisance and dismisses the idea that he is the legendary Humanoid Typhoon.  As time passes, she realizes that Vash isn't the villain that he is made out to be nor the buffoon that he presents himself to be. Gradually, she comes to respect Vash and love him deeply, though in the anime her love is more romantic than in the manga. Meryl eventually forms a special bond with him that allows her to overcome the obstacles that she is faced with. She hides dozens of derringer-style "throwaway" pistols under her traveling cape and is an excellent shot, although she rarely has occasion to use them. In the manga she becomes frightened of Vash's plant-like nature. At one point she sees his memories as a child growing up and struggling alone to the destruction of July City through his eyes. After Bernardelli shuts down while Knives is ravaging the planet, she and Milly assume support roles along with Brad and Luida to help combat Knives. At the end of the manga's story, the two become investigative reporters for the planet's first television broadcasting channel, continuing to follow Vash wherever he goes.

Milly Thompson

 AKA "Stungun Milly" is a fellow Bernardelli agent and Meryl's best friend. Despite physically towering over Meryl, Milly looks up to her and always refers to her in a respectful manner. She appears rather simple, but has a kind heart and also reveals a strength of character and genuine optimism. Milly comes from a very large family, and writes huge masses of letters to them constantly (known as "The Milly Monthly"). Milly manages to hide a very heavy concussion gun, referred to as a "stun-gun", under her coat. The shots, which pop out into the shape of an X-shaped claw, are so powerful they can even knock over trucks. Although she does not have a relationship with Wolfwood in the manga, events after his death indicate that she might have had a romantic interest in him. In the anime, Milly spends the night with Wolfwood before his death and her reaction to the loss of Wolfwood in the anime is considerably greater than in the manga. The manga version of Milly has blond hair whereas the anime depiction has browner-colored hair.

Nicholas D. Wolfwood

, also known as Nicolas the Punisher, is a member of the Eye of Michael, an organization of assassins. After showing potential in the orphanage in which he was raised, Chapel trained and modified him, giving him enhanced abilities and the ability to regenerate from heavy injuries using special vials, though this causes him to age much faster than normal. He was given a special large cross-shaped gun called the Punisher, which contains two machine guns and a rocket launcher. In the anime one of the Punisher's unused arms is shown to contain a rack of pistols. Wolfwood later shoots Chapel and takes his place in the Gung-Ho Guns in an attempt to kill Knives. He fails to do so and is instead sent by Knives to protect Vash until he is able to meet him. After Vash is captured, Wolfwood rescues him and battles his childhood friend, Livio, and his master, now in a wheelchair. He manages to kill Chapel and defeat Livio as well as Livio's alternative personality, Razlo, but having overdosed on the regenerative vials, he soon dies while having a drink with Vash.

In the anime, Wolfwood was raised by an abusive guardian, whom he later shoots and kills. He was taken in by Chapel, who trained him to be his successor. He meets Vash while he is stranded in the desert and the two join forces. Wolfwood's purpose is to raise money for the children in the orphanage he runs, trying to keep other children from suffering as he did in his own childhood. He initially holds the ideals that he must kill, though he eventually comes to accept Vash's ideals. He eventually fights his master, but spares him after defeating him. Legato forces Chapel to shoot Wolfwood, who stumbles into a church and dies. Vash then takes his gun as an act of honor and uses it fighting against Knives. During the series, Wolfwood develops a relationship with Milly that crosses from close friendship into romance and him sleeping with her shortly before his death.

Millions Knives
Adult Millions Knives 
Young Millions Knives 
 is the main antagonist of the Trigun manga and anime and is one of the few fully sentient Plants and Vash's twin brother. They are both born during a mission to further the human race, and they are taken care of by Rem until Knives disrupts the course of the ships, causing them to crash. While Vash believes all beings have potential for good and deserve life, Knives believes in the survival of the fittest. After discovering experiments performed on other plants, he decides that humans are evil and grotesque, and that they need to be eradicated. Vash does not agree with his plans and seeks to stop him, and Knives seeks to dissuade Vash from basing his life around the "idealistic nonsense" preached by Rem.

His character changes, even if slightly, from the manga to the anime; the manga version is shown to be apathetic towards humans but has a caring attitude with other Plants (as he mourns the death of Plants and even apologizes to one for his impulsiveness when "sacrificing all of those companions" when he was younger) and cares about Vash to the point of almost absorbing his twin brother so they can stop fighting and prevent his death. Before his general hatred, Knives is shown to be the most enthusiastic of the twins to interact with human beings, before the discovery of Tessla.

In the anime, Knives evolves from an introverted child to a ruthless sociopath bent on exterminating all humans on the planet. Although he is the primary antagonist, he appears only in flashbacks for most of the series and only appears in person during the last few episodes. Acting on a tip from Wolfwood, Vash finds Knives at a desert oasis in the final episode, leading to a cataclysmic battle. They hold each other to a stalemate at first, but Knives gains the upper hand and tries to annihilate Vash with the power of both brothers' angel arms. Vash shoots him repeatedly, disabling him, then bandages his wounds and carries him back to the nearest town.

His role is far more prominent in the manga. Many years after landing, the two meet in the city of July, and the face off leaves Vash without his left arm and Knives in a very critical state. He slowly regenerates over a period, and forms the Gung-Ho-Guns to act for him. After he revives and learns that he is slowly dying by using his abilities, he begins absorbing other plants into himself, which causes his powers to grow exponentially. After fusing with thousands of plants, Knives launches his "Ark", a floating ship designed to leave humans without any resources. As he absorbs more and more plants, his Ark takes on the form of a sentient organism, capable of defending itself and, in some cases, even teleporting short distances. Vash and Knives eventually fight for a final time, and after the battle, Knives saves Vash from the exploding Ark. After he brings Vash to safety, Knives uses the last of his power to make an apple-tree and then dies.

Legato Bluesummers

 is a man who devotes himself to Knives, and makes it his main goal to have Vash experience eternal pain and suffering. He serves directly under Knives, which also gives him command of the Gung-Ho Guns.

In the manga, Legato takes over while Knives is injured, and uses the Gung-Ho Guns to play a "game" with Vash. He gives Vash a case and each Gung-Ho Gun a half coin to place into it, stating to him that "something interesting will happen" after it is completed. After Knives recovers, Legato's body is crushed and his neck twisted for using the Gung-Ho Guns for his personal agenda. Legato is consequently restricted to a coffin-like container, which is carried by an ogre. Legato later gains a new coffin with metal appendages that allows limited movement. He eventually learns to use his threads to manipulate and strengthen his own body, and takes up a ball and chain weapon and a handgun to battle. He later fights Vash with the coin case completed and subsequently activated, which nullifies his threads, and loses. He then forces Vash to kill him by threatening to kill Livio.

In the anime, Legato, recruited by Knives to make Vash's life a living hell, is placed as the leader of the Gung-Ho Guns and receives Vash's left arm from Knives, granting him the ability to manipulate victims with telepathy. He worships Knives as a god, and sees humans like himself as garbage, only good for consuming resources. Legato forces Vash to kill him by using his powers to threaten Milly and Meryl. Legato thus becomes the first person that Vash ever consciously and willfully kills, fulfilling Legato's promise to "make Vash the Stampede feel eternal pain and suffering".

Rem Saverem

 was a crew member of a SEEDS ship from Earth meant to populate another planet. On Earth, Rem had a lover named Alex, and she took part in the mission in order to start over after his death. In the manga, a sentient Plant was born during the mission and named Tessla. The crew proceeded to perform extensive tests on Tessla, actions opposed by Rem and her crew mate, William Conrad, and which ultimately ended with Tessla's dissection and death. Vash and Knives were born later and, fearing for their safety, Rem kept their birth secret from the other members while they were in stasis. In the anime, Vash and Knives were the only sentient Plants whom Rem protected from the other members of the crew. She raised and mentored them. Her teachings of love and peace, especially that no one has the right to take a life, had a profound influence on Vash. The reason why Vash wears a red coat is that Rem told Vash about her favorite flower, the Red Geranium, which means determination. When Knives sabotaged the fleet, putting it on a crash course with the planet on which Trigun is set, she put him and Vash in an escape pod, but chose to stay behind and attempted to prevent the crash rather than escaping. She managed to undo Knives' tampering, allowing a number of the ships to land safely, but perished when her ship exploded in the atmosphere.  Her last words to Vash were "take care of Knives".

Gung-Ho Guns
The  are a group of assassins assembled to cause great pain to Vash the Stampede. Each one is human, but has sacrificed their humanity in order to gain power, often leaving them mutilated. Each Gung-Ho Gun has an assigned number, but not all numbers are revealed. In the manga, Legato uses them to play a "game" with Vash. He has them each carry half a coin, and gives Vash a case that contains the other half of every coin. He explains that if Vash can reassemble the coins (12 in all), something interesting will happen; it turns out that the filled case can block Legato's powers during their later fight.

Monev the Gale

Monev the Gale was hired as an assassin to fight Vash. Knives locks him in a cell to train his body for twenty years in order to gain the skill and power required to kill Vash. He wears a powered battle suit and carries two high-powered gatling guns on his arms. These guns fire extremely fast due to the pressure chambers located on his back, and have tremendous stopping power, enough to tear through entire buildings. He also carries a wide variety of weapons in a big cloth rucksack, including an enormous minigun, powerful enough to punch through a bank vault. He is defeated by Vash and killed afterward as punishment.

His life is spared in the anime, but he is later killed by E.G. Mine along with Dominique (see below) due to his failure.

Dominique the Cyclops

Dominique the Cyclops has an ability known as the "Demon's Eye", which causes hypnosis and sensory paralysis in her foes, momentarily stunning them and making her movements appear immediate. This effect happens when she lifts her eye-patch, which reveals a reptilian eye in the manga and a red eye in the anime. Vash defeats her by placing pressure on a finger he had injured previously, allowing him to concentrate on the pain and avoid focusing on her eye. In the anime she survives her encounter with Vash but is killed by E.G. Mine and her body is tied to a cross to display for Vash. She commits suicide in the manga to avoid being punished.

E.G. Mine

E.G. Mine is a violent man who wears a suit that resembles a sphere and contains control threads for deploying lethal spikes. Further manipulating these threads, Mine can hurl them towards an enemy. He is quickly defeated in the manga, and he is killed by Rai-Dei after Vash defeats him in the anime.

Rai-Dei the Blade

Rai-Dei(雷泥) is a samurai who seeks the knowledge learned only when facing death. He carries a sword with a built in gun that can be fired from the hilt, but not meant for shooting, instead when he fires the gun in the middle of his swing it allows him to swing his sword with enough force to create a sonic blast. In the anime, he expresses anger in the fact that Vash is refusing to make his mark true and aim to kill, claiming he wants "a real battle". He escapes after Vash's Angel Arm is forced to activate, though Wolfwood soon kills him. In the manga, he wears "roller skates" that allow him to move at phenomenal speeds. After Vash defeats him, Rai-Dei attempts to attack Vash from behind, but is quickly killed by Wolfwood.

Leonof the Puppet-Master

Leonof the Puppet-Master is an elderly man who controls numerous puppets with an elaborate system of wires. He can manipulate them to look like real people, and uses them to do horrible things to people close to Vash. His real name is Emilio, having known Vash during his childhood. His love interest dies sometime after, and he goes into puppet making to mend his broken spirit. He cares for her body for a number of years until he battles Vash in the ruins of a floating ship Vash had lived on. During the fight, a portion of the ship drops away and he tries unsuccessfully to hold on to the box containing the remains of his love interest before it falls overboard. Dangling over the edge by one of his puppet wires, Leonof strikes at Vash to force him to let go of the other end and falls to his death.

The anime does not feature his background, and he is simply an assassin who can use his puppets to do various tasks, such as delivering reports to Legato, spying on people, and attacking them. After Leonof kills Brad using a puppet double of his longtime friend Jessica, Wolfwood kills Leonof in turn. Vash uses some of Leonof's control wires in his fight against Hoppered the Gauntlet, and later during his final showdown with Knives.

Gray the Ninelives

Gray the Ninelives is a very large man known for being indestructible. In the manga, he is actually a mechanical suit controlled from the inside by nine dwarves, who will only stop fighting when all of them are dead. The suit is destroyed and only two survive. They are captured and turn over their coin, and later escape.

The anime version is a cyborg whose only remaining human part is his brain, which is deeply encased in armor. Wolfwood shoots out a pipeline filled with corrosive liquid, which pours down on Gray and melts his armor to expose the brain and internal frame, and he then blows Gray's upper body apart with the rocket launcher in his Cross Punisher. However, the legs remain active and deploy a hidden launcher of their own to destroy one of the plants powering the ship, leading to its crash.

Hoppered the Gauntlet

Hoppered the Gauntlet is a masked man who wears a set of armor to cover his degenerated and vestigial legs, while using his large arms to move. The armor acts like a top and he uses a shield to propel himself at high speeds. He seeks to kill Vash to avenge a mute and blind woman detached from the world, killed during the destruction of July. He eventually loses his mask, exposing a large cross carved into his face. During his final battle, he sees Vash's memory of July, has a revelation that he has made the wrong choice, and he is killed after turning against the Guns.

The anime does not feature his backstory or expose his face, and instead has him just wish to make Vash suffer. After Vash deflects his attack with a well-placed gunshot, he hurls himself into one of the plants powering the ship, leading to its crash.

Zazie the Beast

Zazie the Beast is a collective of group-minded insects able to take over the bodies of humans. These insects are the original inhabitants of the planet No Man's Land, who form an alliance with Knives to see whether humans or Plants are better to co-exist with them. They originally take over the body of a young boy, but it is destroyed by Hoppered after spying on him. Zazie later reappears in the body of a teenage girl, though it is also destroyed by Legato after trying to infect Knives. The last body is an odd-looking man in disco-clothing used to deliver his coin to Vash. The main hive is destroyed by Knives soon afterward.

In the anime, Zazie is a demon who has possessed the body of Bete, a troubled young boy capable of controlling sand-worms with a high-frequency device he wears on his head. Vash shoots and destroys the device, and Zazie takes full control of Bete to hold Vash, Meryl, and Milly at gunpoint. He is killed by Wolfwood, prompting a heated disagreement between the two over their morals. (In the manga, the conflict is triggered by Wolfwood's killing of Rai-Dei.)

Midvalley the Hornfreak

Midvalley the Hornfreak is a violent musician who is able to use his tenor saxophone to generate destructive sound as well as play frequencies that drive those that hear it into a murderous frenzy. He is also capable of neutralizing sounds completely by playing counter-frequencies. He and his band originally just killed for money until being found by Knives, who killed all except Midvalley after they refused Knives's offer to join him. Terrified and resentful of Knives and Legato, Midvalley attempts to betray and desert the Guns, but Legato discovers his plan and takes control of Hoppered's body to shoot and kill him. Legato subsequently uses Midvalley's corpse to kill Hoppered, after which the two are buried side by side and Midvalley's horn is hung on his tombstone.

In the anime, Midvalley plays Sylvia, a hybrid between an alto and tenor saxophone, mainly acting as Legato's bodyguard before being the last Gun to fight Vash. In their battle, Midvalley reveals his ability to synchronize sound waves with pain receptors in the body. Vash damages his horn with several carefully placed shots, preventing him from being able to play, and Midvalley commits suicide by triggering the now-jammed machine guns hidden in the bell so that they backfire into his chest.

Caine the Longshot
Caine the Longshot is a member of the Gung-Ho Guns invented for the anime in place of Elendira the Crimsonnail. He is a mute, talented sniper who utilizes a rifle with a barrel many meters long; its scope allows him to fire on targets from many miles away. The poncho he wears can change its coloration to perfectly blend in with his surroundings, and he also wears a broad-brimmed hat and a steel mask whose left eye is patched shut. Vash distracts him long enough to shoot his rifle to pieces, but instead of surrendering, Caine commits suicide by shooting himself in the head with a revolver. He is later buried in the desert, with his hat and a piece of the rifle barrel marking the grave.

Elendira the Crimsonnail

Elendira the Crimsonnail, referred to as the lost thirteenth Gung-Ho Gun in the manga, is the most powerful of the group. She is a transgender woman, and wears feminine clothing and a pillbox hat. She shoots giant nails from a large briefcase that transforms into a crossbow with great proficiency, being capable of launching several in less than a second. However, underneath her outer garments she also wears restraining armour, and after disabling it, she is able to move at blinding speed. Elendira also has the power to project the image of the death of her opponents by touch, crippling them with the realistic illusion. She is jealous of Legato, as Legato is not part of the Guns, suggesting that Legato is more important to Knives than she. Elendira was apparently one of Knives' very first companions, seen walking with him as a child along with Legato. She fights Livio twice, the first time skewering his torso with many nails after launching him through several buildings. Their subsequent rematch results in a similar outcome, despite Livio and Razlo's combined efforts to match her speed. However, Elendira is ultimately killed when Livio grabs her and uses one of the nails going through his torso to run Elendira through.

Chapel the Evergreen

Merely known as "Chapel" in the manga, he is a member of the "Eye of Michael", an organization of ecclesiastical assassins founded by a church that worships Plants. They provide Knives with mercenaries, with three slots of the Gung-Ho Guns reserved for the Eye of Michael's best. Chapel, also known as 'Master C', is the mentor of Wolfwood, teaching him all the skills in being an assassin.  He is subsequently shot and left as a paraplegic by Wolfwood, who impersonates Chapel. He is only middle-aged, but, like the rest of the members of the Eye, the artificial modifications on his body which grants him enhanced strength and reflexes and limited regenerative abilities have aged him considerably. He uses a wheelchair after being shot by Wolfwood, and wields a large cross-shaped machine gun similar to Wolfwood's Punisher with four spiked ends at the base of the cross.  Wolfwood cracks Chapel's skull and breaks his neck with an immense head-butt, but Chapel recovers from these injuries and tries to kill Wolfwood, not caring that his current protégé Razlo the Tri-Punisher of Death is in the way. Enraged at Chapel's callous behavior, Razlo kills him.

The anime features Chapel the Evergreen as Wolfwood's direct mentor. He carries the parent version of Wolfwood's Cross Punisher, though Chapel's splits into twin machine guns. He cares for Nicholas after Nicholas kills his abusive guardian. He dresses in a dark green suit and has red goggles grafted to his face. He is killed by Knives after an unsuccessful attempt to kill Legato for taking control of him and forcing him to kill Wolfwood.

Livio and Razlo
Livio the Double Fang is a childhood friend of Wolfwood and the final member of the Gung-Ho Guns from the Eye of Michael. He wields the Double Fangs, two small cross-shaped machine guns strapped on his arms that fire from both ends. His body has been enhanced through increased metabolic rate, allowing him to recover from near fatal wounds in a matter of seconds. He grows up in the same orphanage as Wolfwood, having the nickname "Livio the Crybaby".

Razlo the Tri-P(unisher) of Death is a violent and psychotic split personality, treated as another member of the Gung-Ho Guns. After repeated abuse by his father, Livio eventually developed the Razlo personality, with Razlo taking all the abuse, allowing the Livio persona to not know about it. Razlo only appears after Livio has suffered intense pain or violence, and often commits act of violence, such as killing Livio's parents. He uses three Punishers, the same gun as Wolfwood owns, with the aid of a bionic arm, thus giving him the nickname 'the tri-p of death', short for Tri-Punisher of Death. He is aided by three servants who carry his Punishers while Livio's persona is active.

The two fight with Wolfwood and they are defeated, though Wolfwood dies after sustaining immense injuries while overdosing himself on the regeneration drug. In the aftermath of the fight Livio comes to terms with Razlo's existence stating that he is now strong enough to face life on his own without the questionable help of his psychotic personality, who recedes in the back of his mind. Vash decides to forgive Livio afterward, and he becomes Vash's partner in an act of redemption, seeking to live as Wolfwood would have. Livio fights against Elendira. Unable to win himself, Livio allows Razlo to awake and help him kill the Crimsonnail, by utilizing Razlo's faster reflexes and better eyesight. Livio later lives together with the children in his old orphanage and is shown paying his respects to Wolfwood's gravestone.

Other characters

Nebraska Family
Father Nebraska  is the patriarch of the Nebraska family. He is a gaunt, ugly little man with a monocle, and only three teeth. He and his son Gofsef broke out of May prison, where they were serving a long prison sentence. He leads the family on an attempt to capture Vash the Stampede for the bounty on his head.
Gofsef Nebraska is a giant with a large oblong-shaped forehead who appears unintelligent. He functions as a mode of transport for his father and obediently does his bidding. He has cybernetics which include a spout on the back that spews out steam and a right arm that can launch his fist like a wrecking ball.
Patricia Nebraska is the matriarch of the Nebraska Family and is as huge as her eldest son Gofsef. She uses her brute strength, throwing her three almost identical armored sons, Kanta, Tonkichi and Chinpei as shot putts.
Marilyn  Nebraska  is young and attractive woman and appears apparently normal for a member of the Nebraska family.

Kuroneko-sama

 is a black cat who reoccurs in the background of the anime and manga. She appears in every episode of the anime and randomly in the manga. Nightow has stated that she is just something easy and calming to draw in between action scenes. His most common response to queries as to her nature or significance at anime convention panels is "Kuroneko-sama is a small black cat."

In Trigun Maximum, Kuroneko-sama only appears in Nightow's commentary at the end of each issue, often criticizing the author's lazy and silly nature. Kuroneko-sama also makes several cameo appearances in the anime adaptation of Nightow's other work, Blood Blockade Battlefront.

References

Trigun
Trigun